Eberstadt is the southernmost borough of Darmstadt in Hessen, Germany with a population of 23,728.

Geography

In the north Eberstadt borders to the boroughs of Bessungen and Darmstadt-West, in the east and south to the municipalities Mühltal, Seeheim-Jugenheim and in the west to the town of Pfungstadt. Eberstadt is a part of the Bergstraße. Between Eberstadt and Zwingenberg it splits into the "Old" and "New" Bergstraße (Bundesstraße 3).

Statistical districts

There are 5 statistical districts subdividing Eberstadt:

Structure

Eberstadt spreads mainly along Heidelberger Landstraße. This corresponds to the course of the tramline to Darmstadt. At its historical village centre (Alt-Eberstadt) is the old intersection between the north-southern-tended Heidelberger Landstraße, the eastbound Mühltalstraße and the westbound Pfungstädter Straße. In former times this point marked the cross-point of Bundesstraße 3 and Bundestraße 426, but both interregional important roads were later moved outside the town as bypass.

Eberstadt spreads out mainly northwards from the centre in direction to Darmstadt. In all other directions around the centre it spread evenly, so that today it has a form of a bottle lined up to the north. This development is comparable to other towns in the circle around Darmstadt like Griesheim or Weiterstadt.

Villenkolonie

The Villenkolonie, marking the bond between Alt-Eberstadt and Darmstadt(-Bessungen), is the northern "bottle-neck" of Eberstadt.
It follows in the direction from Darmstadt to Eberstadt the housing areas of the U.S. Army Garrison Darmstadt around Cambrai-Fritsch Kaserne.

This upscale residential area is located mainly eastwards from Heidelberger Landstraße at the northern Odenwald-slopes. According to inscriptions at some villas, they were built around the turn of the 20th century. The northern parts are built in a former forest, so there are many trees between the houses, which gives the area the typical quiet, shady environment.

Alt-Eberstadt

Alt-Eberstadt is the oldest part of Eberstadt. Contrary to Villenkolonie the houses here are predominantly build wall-on-wall. Some houses in Oberstraße and Heidelberger Landstraße are older than 300 years. 
Many of these old buildings provide an insight into an agricultural past of the village. Along the Heidelberger Landstraße are three notable points in Alt-Eberstadt, all of them are also tramstations.

The northernmost first is the town-centre, which is at Wartehalle, the central bus- & tramstation. From this point southwards is the shoppingstreet of Eberstadt, which runs up to the second notable point, the Modaubrücke, where the Heidelberger Landstraße crosses the creek Modau, and the intersection of north–south and east–west roads is located. The Protestant church, first mentioned in  1379, marks the third point. It is built upon a hill, where it can be seen from all directions, making it a landmarks of Eberstadt.

History
Eberstadt was in the time of Charlemagne a small town south of the River Modau, at the intersection of two trade routes; one was a Roman road from Ladenburg. The first documentary mention of Eberstadt is in a document about Walther and Gemahlin Williswind at the Lorsch Abbey, dated 1 September 782.

In the 13th century, Lords of Frankenstein came to Eberstadt. It remained for over 400 years the possession Lords of Frankenstein. The Frankenstein Castle is first mentioned in 1252.

In 1292 the Frankensteins opened the castle to the counts of Katzenelnbogen (County of Katzenelnbogen) Katzenelnbogen and leagued with them.

The Landgrave of Hesse-Darmstadt acquired the residence in 1661. Later the Frankenstein owner sold their property and moved to Middle Franconia.

In 1635, during the Thirty Years' War, the Swedes burned down almost the entire village. Many of the residents who were able to escape to the fortified Darmstadt died there of the plague. The reconstruction lasted more than 40 years.

In the 18th century the social situation of the inhabitants of Eberstadt improved. The lively tourist traffic through the town allowed trade and commerce to flourish, and many large inns sprang up along the main street.

In the 19th century, the new Main-Neckar railway and the beginning of industrialization helped Eberstadt to develop further. The number of inhabitants increased sharply, and there was a lively club life. The town hall built in 1847 still bears witness to the self-confidence of the up-and-coming community.

After 1900, Eberstadt had a good 6,000 inhabitants and had expanded in the north with a colony of villas up to the municipal boundary of Darmstadt. A narrow-gauge suburban railway connected both places. Own water, gas and electricity works, a public library, a public bath, a new cemetery hall and two new schools were built. More industry settled there, including six breweries, and street lighting was introduced. In 1914 the suburban railway was electrified and operated as a tram. This could not be extended until 1936 as an overland line to Seeheim and Jugenheim.

On 1 April 1937, the community, which had been independent until then, became part of Darmstadt.

Coat of arms 

The Eberstädter coat of arms goes back to the seal of Lords of Frankenstein Court. The oldest evidence of this seal is from the October 1617 and shows a boar with three acorns.

The present coat of arms in use today was established in 1972. It shows a boar in the upper field and acorns at the bottom. The upper half of the shield is yellow, the lower black, the boar dark red, his tusks are white. With the colors red and gold are from the Lords of Frankenstein.

The oldest seal impressions is from 1617.  The name Eberstadt, can possibly be attributed to a name, probably of that the Frankish nobleman, who in the 7th or early 8th Century founded the settlement.

Transportation

Roads

Eberstadt is situated at the Bundesautobahn 5 at the next exit just southwards the Autobahn-interchange Darmstädter Kreuz.

Bundesstraße 3 tangents Eberstadt southbound to Bensheim and northbound to Darmstadt city. The southbound part of B3 is the new Bergstraße.

Besides B3 tangents the east-western-directed Bundestraße 426 Eberstadt. This is one of the major connections from the Bundesautobahn 5 to the Odenwald. In eastern direction it connects Eberstadt to Mühltal, Ober-Ramstadt and the Odenwald, in western direction to Pfungstadt and Gernsheim.

Trams & Buses

The train station with Regionalbahn-connections to Frankfurt, Heidelberg and Darmstadt is outside the town-centre.

At Wartehalle, the central bus & tram-station, are given tram-connections to Darmstadt-city and the northern parts of the Bergstraße, e.g. Seeheim-Jugenheim, Alsbach and bus connections to Mühltal and Pfungstadt both with the regional transportation company RMV. The bus VIA25227, Bus P and Bus PE serve the town.

Trams in Darmstadt service Eberstadt, lines 1, 6 and 7 travel to Eberstadt. Lines 6 and 7 continue on to Alsbach-Hähnlein

Boroughs of Darmstadt
Darmstadt has 9 official 'Stadtteile' (boroughs). These are, alphabetically:

Darmstadt-Arheilgen
Darmstadt-Bessungen
Darmstadt-Eberstadt
Darmstadt-Kranichstein
Darmstadt-Mitte ('Central')
Darmstadt-Nord ('North')
Darmstadt-Ost ('East')
Darmstadt-West ('West')
Darmstadt-Wixhausen

Sister cities

As borough of Darmstadt, Eberstadt has no sister cities, so sister cities are a matter of whole the city of Darmstadt (see Darmstadt's sister cities). In a development area at the southeastern border (district Am Frankenstein), some streets are named according to Darmstadt's sister cities, e.g. Chesterfieldstraße or Grazstraße.

References

Eberstadt